The 1982 NCAA Division I Women's Tennis Championships were the first annual championships to determine the national champions of NCAA Division I women's singles, doubles, and team collegiate tennis in the United States.

The inaugural women's team championship was won by the Stanford Cardinal.

Stanford defeated UCLA in the final round, 6–3.

The women's singles title was won by Alycia Moulton from Stanford, and the women's doubles title was won by Heather Ludloff and Lynn Lewis from UCLA.

Host site
This year's tournaments were hosted by the University of Utah at the Utah Tennis Facility in Salt Lake City, Utah. The men's and women's tournaments would not be held at the same site until 2006.

Team tournament

See also
NCAA Division II Tennis Championships (Men, Women)
NCAA Division III Tennis Championships (Men, Women)

References

External links
List of NCAA Women's Tennis Champions

NCAA Division I tennis championships
College women's tennis in the United States
NCAA Division I Women's Tennis Championships
NCAA Division I Women's Tennis Championships
NCAA Division I Women's Tennis Championships